This list is of the Cultural Properties of Japan designated in the category of  for the Prefecture of Kagawa.

National Cultural Properties
As of 1 February 2015, one Important Cultural Property has been designated, being of national significance.

Prefectural Cultural Properties
As of 1 May 2014, seven properties have been designated at a prefectural level.

See also
 Cultural Properties of Japan
 List of National Treasures of Japan (archaeological materials)
 List of Historic Sites of Japan (Kagawa)
 List of Cultural Properties of Japan - historical materials (Kagawa)
 Sanuki Province

References

External links
  Cultural Properties in Kagawa Prefecture

Archaeological materials, Kagawa
Kagawa,Cultural Properties
History of Kagawa Prefecture